Colônia Santo Antônio is a district located in the city of Amaral Ferrador, Rio Grande do Sul, Brazil.

History 
Approximately 80 years ago, Colônia Santo Antônio was called Tubuna and Amaral Ferrador was called São José at that time Colônia Santo Antônio was a town of Encruzilhada do Sul.

Rio Grande do Sul